Anthony Rainbow is a Gaelic football manager and former player from County Kildare, Ireland. He played with the Kildare county team for almost 20 years with whom he won two Leinster Senior Football Championship medals, in 1998 and 2000. He played in the 1998 All Ireland Senior Football final where Kildare lost out to Galway. He won an All Star in 1998. He also won an O'Byrne Cup medal in 2003. He played with Ireland in the International Rules Series in 2001. He announced his retirement after Kildare's defeat to Down in the All Ireland semi-final in 2010.

In late 2012, he was appointed manager of the senior Carlow county football team, having been a member of the backroom team.

Rainbow was managing Dublin club Ballyboden St Enda's during the COVID-19 pandemic when he was held within County Kildare to stop the spread.

Honours
 2 Leinster Senior Football Championships (1998, 2000)
 2 Kildare Intermediate Football Championships (1989, 2007)
 1 All Stars Award (2000)
 1 International Rules Series (2001)

References

Year of birth missing (living people)
Living people
Ballyboden St Enda's GAA
Gaelic football backs
Gaelic football managers
Kildare inter-county Gaelic footballers
Suncroft Gaelic footballers